Frederick Gordon Bradley  (March 21, 1886 – March 30, 1966) was a Canadian and Dominion of Newfoundland politician.

Parentage
Born in St. John's, Newfoundland Colony, he was the son of Norman Bradley and Evangeline Trimm.

Education and employment
Bradley became the principal of the Methodist School in Bonavista after finishing his education at Methodist College in 1906. Three years later, he studied law at Dalhousie University and was called to the bar in 1915. Later he started his own law practice.

Politics
In 1924, he was elected to the House of Assembly representing the electoral district of Port de Grave. A Conservative, he was a Minister without Portfolio in the cabinet of Walter Stanley Monroe until he resigned from the caucus in 1926 to sit as an Independent. He was re-elected in 1928 representing the electoral district of Trinity Centre as a Liberal and served as Minister without Portfolio and Solicitor-General in the cabinet of Richard Squires. Re-elected in 1932, as only one of two Liberals, he was the leader of the opposition. An opponent of the creation of the Commission of Government, he returned to his law practice in 1933.

Newfoundland National Convention
In 1947, Bradley was elected to sit in the Newfoundland National Convention. After the death of Cyril J. Fox he became the chairman.

The London and Ottawa Delegations
The Newfoundland National Convention dispatched two delegations, one to the United Kingdom (the "London Delegation") and one to Canada (the "Ottawa Delegation").

London Delegation
The London Delegation was unsuccessful in its attempt to get the promise of continued financial aid if Newfoundland were to resume Responsible Government.

Ottawa Delegation

The Ottawa Delegation negotiated terms of union for Confederation between Newfoundland and Canada in 1947. Its members (with their districts) were:     
 T. G. W. Ashbourne (Twillingate)
 F. G. Bradley (Bonavista South)
 Charles Ballam (Humber)
 Lester Burry (Labrador)
 P. W. Crummey (Bay de Verde)
 Joey Smallwood (Bonavista Centre)

The negotiations were largely a one way affair. Any union with Canada was dictated by the British North America Act (BNA), under which Canada had come into being in 1867.

Post-Confederation
After Confederation with Canada, he was appointed Secretary of State for Canada by Liberal Prime Minister Louis St. Laurent, making him the first Canadian federal cabinet minister from Newfoundland. He was elected to the House of Commons of Canada representing the riding of Bonavista—Twillingate in the 1949 federal election. In 1953, he was appointed to the Senate of Canada representing the senatorial division of Bonavista-Twillingate, Newfoundland and Labrador. He died in office in 1966.

References
 Frederick Gordon Bradley

Further reading

External links
 

1886 births
1966 deaths
Liberal Party of Canada senators
Canadian senators from Newfoundland and Labrador
Liberal Party of Canada MPs
Members of the House of Commons of Canada from Newfoundland and Labrador
Members of the King's Privy Council for Canada
Members of the Newfoundland and Labrador House of Assembly
Politicians from St. John's, Newfoundland and Labrador
Government ministers of the Dominion of Newfoundland
Newfoundland National Convention members
Place of death missing
Canadian King's Counsel
20th-century King's Counsel